"Nothing Rhymed" is a song written and recorded by the Irish singer-songwriter Gilbert O'Sullivan. It was released on 30 October 1970. 

The song was O'Sullivan's first hit single in the UK. It peaked at number 8 in the UK Singles Chart, number 2 in Ireland, and number 1 in the Netherlands. "Nothing Rhymed" subsequently appeared on his 1971 album, Himself.

Background
According to O'Sullivan, he wrote the song after seeing film footage of starving children in Africa (during the Nigerian Civil War) on television for the first time. Later, after being signed by manager Gordon Mills, the song was then recorded and released. Renowned session bassist Herbie Flowers features on the original recording. 

Pop historian Paul Gambaccini described it as "one of the great songs of all time" in the 2007 BBC documentary Kings of 70s Romance. In 2012, Paul Weller declared "Nothing Rhymed" and "Alone Again (Naturally)" as "two of my favourite songs, great lyrics, great tunes".

Cover versions
The song is among O'Sullivan's most covered. Tom Jones who, like O'Sullivan, was managed by Gordon Mills, covered it on his 1971 album She's a Lady. That same year, a faithful rendering of the song but with new Italian lyrics was released by I Profeti as the title track of their second album Era Bella. Yvonne Elliman covered it on her 1972 self-titled debut album. It was also covered by the Guess Who frontman Burton Cummings on his self-titled first solo album released in 1976. Canadian singer-songwriter Emm Gryner covered the song on her 2005 album Songs of Love and Death. Since 2002, Morrissey has occasionally covered "Nothing Rhymed" in concert. It has been noted that Morrissey's song "Yes I Am Blind" bears a musical resemblance to the song.

Charts

References

External links
 Gilbert O Sullivan - Nothing Rhymed at TopPop,  26 October 1980

1970 singles
Gilbert O'Sullivan songs
Songs written by Gilbert O'Sullivan
Number-one singles in the Netherlands
MAM Records singles
1970 songs